Hendrick Hamilton Lusk is an American former professional football player who was a tight end for two seasons for the New Orleans Saints, Green Bay Packers and Miami Dolphins of the National Football League (NFL).  In 2010, Lusk became the head coach of the John F. Kennedy High School football team in Sacramento, California. He resigned from coaching John F. Kennedy High School due to a lewd photo of him surfacing.

Lusk was a high school football coach for Murray High School in Salt Lake City, Utah. He began coaching at Desert Hills High School, and won the 3AA state championship in 2016. In 2017, Lusk became the head coach of the Monterey High School football team, the school which he attended.

References

1972 births
Living people
People from Seaside, California
American football tight ends
Utah Utes football players
New Orleans Saints players
Green Bay Packers players
Miami Dolphins players
Players of American football from California